Kristen Mary Jenner ( Houghton  , formerly Kardashian; born November 5, 1955) is an American media personality, socialite, and businesswoman. She rose to fame starring in the reality television series Keeping Up with the Kardashians (2007–2021).

She has four children from her first marriage to lawyer Robert Kardashian: Kourtney, Kim, Khloé and Robert, and two children from her second marriage to television personality and retired Olympic Games medalist Bruce Jenner (now Caitlyn): Kendall and Kylie.

Early life 
Jenner was born in San Diego, California, on November 5, 1955, the elder of two children born to Mary Jo "M. J." Shannon (née Campbell; born 1934), who owned a children's clothing store, and Robert True "Bob" Houghton (1931–1975), an engineer. When she was seven years old, M. J. and Bob divorced, and she and her younger sister, Karen Casey (née Houghton; born 1958), were raised by their mother. M. J. would eventually remarry, to businessman Harry Shannon (1926–2003), who helped raise her and Karen. By her mother's marriage to Harry, she gained a half-brother, Steven "Steve" Shannon.

Three months after moving to Oxnard, California, Shannon's business partner allegedly left with all the company's capital, so the family moved back to San Diego. In San Diego, Jenner worked at Shannon & Company, a children's clothing store that belonged to her mother. Jenner attended Clairemont High School and graduated in 1973. In 1975, Jenner lost her biological father Robert Houghton in a car crash at nineteen years old. She worked for American Airlines as a flight attendant for a year in 1976.

Television career

Keeping Up with the Kardashians 

Jenner met with Ryan Seacrest in 2007 to pursue a reality television show based on her family. Seacrest, who had his own production company, decided to develop the idea, having the popular family-based show The Osbournes in his mind. Jenner further commented on the possible series:

The show eventually was picked up to air on the E! cable network, with Jenner acting as the executive producer. The series focused on the personal and professional lives of the Kardashian–Jenner blended families. The series debuted on October 14, 2007 and became one of the longest-running reality television shows in the country. The final (twentieth) season premiered on March 18, 2021. The show resulted in the development of several spin-offs, such as Kourtney and Khloé Take Miami (2009), Kourtney and Kim Take New York (2011), Khloé & Lamar (2011), Rob & Chyna (2016), and Life of Kylie (2017)

Kris 

Jenner hosted a pop culture-driven daytime talk show, Kris. The series began its six-week trial summer run on several Fox-owned stations on July 15, 2013.

Kanye West, her then-son-in-law through his marriage to Kim, revealed the first public picture of Jenner's granddaughter North West on the show. The show's six-week trial run was not extended.

The Kardashians 

On December 31, 2021, it was announced that Jenner and her family would be appearing in a new series on Hulu called The Kardashians. It debuted on April 14, 2022. In July 2022, Hulu announced that the show would be returning for a second season which aired on September 22, 2022.

Other ventures

Business 
Jenner runs her own production company, Jenner Communications, which is based in Los Angeles. Since before the start of Keeping Up with the Kardashians, she has managed her daughters' Kim, Kourtney, Khloe, Kendall, and Kylie's career. She also is involved with the business management of her other daughters and son.

Jenner opened a children's boutique in 2004 with her eldest daughter, Kourtney. The boutique was called "Smooch" and was open for almost six years before closing down in 2009. In 2011, Jenner launched a clothing line, Kris Jenner Kollection with QVC. Jenner had previously sold exercise equipment with QVC in the 1990s. In April 2020, Jenner teamed up with daughter Kim to launch a perfume collaboration titled KKW x Kris.

Writing 
Jenner's autobiography, Kris Jenner... and All Things Kardashian, was released in November 2011. She later wrote a cookbook entitled In the Kitchen with Kris: A Kollection of Kardashian-Jenner Family Favorites, which was released in October 2014.

Public image 
Jenner has often been referred to as the "matriarch" of the family. Dimitri Ehrlich of Interview magazine called her "the matriarch of the Kardashian-Jenner brood" and the "21st century's preeminent female pop-cultural brand-builder." Jenner explained her operations as a businesswoman in her memoir Kris Jenner...And All Things Kardashian: "I started to look at our careers like pieces on a chessboard...Every day, I woke up and walked into my office and asked myself, 'What move do you need to make today?' It was very calculated. My business decisions and strategies were very intentional, definite and planned to the nth degree."

Jenner has been featured on the covers of numerous lifestyle and fashion magazines, including CR Fashion Book, Redbook, Cosmopolitan, Harper's Bazaar, The Hollywood Reporter, Es Magazine, Variety, New You, Haute Living, WSJ. Magazine and Stellar.

Personal life

Marriages, relationships, and family 

Jenner's first marriage was to lawyer Robert Kardashian (who later became widely known for his early legal representation of O. J. Simpson) on July 8, 1978. They have four children: daughters Kourtney (born 1979), Kim (born 1980), Khloé (born 1984), and son Rob (born 1987). They divorced in March 1991 but remained close friends until his death from esophageal cancer in 2003.

In 2012, Jenner confessed that she had an affair with former soccer player and animator Todd Waterman during her marriage to Kardashian. She referred to Waterman as "Ryan" in her autobiography, but he revealed his identity on his own. They had an encounter on Keeping up with the Kardashians while Kris was having a tennis lesson.

In April 1991, one month after her divorce from Kardashian, Jenner married her second spouse, retired Olympian Bruce Jenner, who publicly came out as a transgender woman in 2015, taking the name Caitlyn. They have two daughters together: Kendall (born 1995) and Kylie (born 1997); in her autobiography, Jenner explained that she named her daughter Kendall Nicole after the late Nicole Brown Simpson. By marriage to Bruce, Jenner also had four stepchildren: Burt, Cassandra "Casey", Brandon, and Brody.

The Jenners announced their separation in October 2013, and on September 22, 2014, Kris filed for divorce, citing irreconcilable differences. The divorce became final on March 23, 2015, because of a six-month state legal requirement. Jenner described the breakup with Caitlyn as "the most passive-aggressive thing", saying that while she had known of Caitlyn's use of hormones in the 1980s, "there wasn't a gender issue. Nobody mentioned a gender issue." 

Jenner has ten grandchildren. She has been in a relationship with Corey Gamble since around 2014.

O. J. Simpson trial 

Jenner and her family suffered emotional turmoil during the O. J. Simpson trial (1994–1995), later described as the "Trial of the Century." Jenner was a good friend of O.J.'s ex-wife, Nicole Brown, and Jenner's first husband, Robert Kardashian, was one of O.J. Simpson's "Dream Team" of defense lawyers during the trial.

She was portrayed by American actress Selma Blair in the FX limited series American Crime Story: The People v. O. J. Simpson, which premiered in February 2016.

California Community Church 

Jenner and Pastor Brad Johnson founded the California Community Church in 2012. It originally was called the Life Change Community Church, located in Agoura Hills, California.

Filmography

As herself

As producer

In music videos

References

External links 

 

1955 births
American Christians
American socialites
Living people
Participants in American reality television series
People from San Diego
Kris
Kris
Flight attendants
American women in business